Bethel Branch is a stream in Marion County in the U.S. state of Missouri. It is a tributary of the Fabius River.

Bethel Branch took its name from a nearby church of the same name, which in turn was named after Bethel, a place mentioned in the Hebrew Bible.

See also
List of rivers of Missouri

References

Rivers of Marion County, Missouri
Rivers of Missouri